Squeeze or squeezing may refer to:

Film and television
 Squeeze (1980 film), a New Zealand film directed by Richard Turner
 Squeeze (1997 film), an American film directed by Robert Patton-Spruill
 "Squeeze" (The X-Files), an episode of the science fiction TV series
 "Squeeze" (The Walking Dead), an episode of the television series The Walking Dead

Finance
 Credit squeeze, a reduction in the availability of loans
 Short squeeze, a rapid increase in a stock's price due to supply and demand

Music
 Squeeze (band), an English rock band
 Squeeze (Squeeze album), their 1978 debut LP
 Squeeze (The Velvet Underground album), 1973
 Squeeze (Fiona album), 1992
 Squeeze (Sasami album). 2022
 "Squeeze", a song by Fifth Harmony from 7/27, 2016 
 Squeeze, an earlier name for the 1970s Belgian glam-rock band T.U.S.H.

Science and technology
 Compression (physics), in mechanics
 Mask squeeze, in diving medicine, a type of barotrauma
 Squeeze job, in oil and gas exploration, the process of injecting cement slurry into a well
 Squeeze paper, in epigraphy, a method to copy inscriptions 
 Squeezed coherent state, a type of quantum state 
Computer software:
 Squeeze, the codename of version 6.0 of the Debian Linux operating system
 SQ (program), an early CP/M data compression program

Sports and games
 Squeeze (chess) or zugzwang, a chess tactic
 Squeeze play (baseball), a type of sacrifice in baseball
 Squeeze play (bridge) or simply squeeze, a tactic in contract bridge
 Squeeze play (poker), a bluff re-raise

Other uses
 Hug, a form of human endearment
 In slang, a romantic or sexual partner
 A highly toxic Sterno-based alcoholic drink of the Prohibition era

See also
 The Squeeze (disambiguation)
 Squeezed (disambiguation)
 Sorenson Squeeze, video encoding software
 Squeeze play (disambiguation)
 Squeeze bottle, food container
 Squeeze Box (song)

 
 
 SQUOZE